Affi is a comune (municipality) in the Province of Verona in the Italian region Veneto, located about  west of Venice and about  northwest of Verona.

The municipality of Affi is divided into the frazioni of Affi, Incaffi and Caorsa. Incaffi was the residence (and the place of death) of the Italian physician Girolamo Fracastoro.

Affi borders the following municipalities: Bardolino, Cavaion Veronese, Costermano, and Rivoli Veronese.

References

Cities and towns in Veneto